{{DISPLAYTITLE:C3H6O2S}}
The molecular formula C3H6O2S (molar mass: 106.14 g/mol, exact mass: 106.0089 u) may refer to:

 Thiolactic acid (2-mercaptopropionic acid)
 3-Mercaptopropionic acid (3-MPA)